İnci Asena (born in 1948) is a Turkish publisher and a poet. She is also a former Miss Turkey.

Life
She was born to Muhtar and Nihal in Istanbul, Turkey in 1948. She is the younger sister of Duygu Asena, a notable journalist. She graduated from the School of English studies at Istanbul University.

In 1966, she participated at the Miss Turkey beauty contest under the pseudonym Aylin Öndersev, which actually was her aunt's name, who died young. She won the contest. She married journalist Halit Çapın, and gave birth to a daughter named Berfu. Her marriage ended with divorce lasting briefly.

Literature career
In 1990, she established a publishing company named Adam Yayınları. Her poems appeared in Adam Sanat, a literary periodical of the company. In some of her poems, she used the pen name Ani Toros.  She also wrote books, and is a member of PEN International.

Books
Her books are the following:

1992: Türk Yazınından Seçilmiş Aşk Şiirleri (Collected poems)
1993: Türk Yazınından Seçilmiş Ayrılık, Özlem, Yalnızlık Şiirleri (Collected poems)
1993: Tramvay Döşeriz Ay Döşeriz (Poetry)
1994: Dünya Yazınından Seçilmiş Mektuplar (Collected letters)
1996: Çıplak Bakamıyorum (Poetry)
1998: Üç Gün Paris: Fotoğraf Arkası Notları (Travel)
1999: Amsterdam’dan Fotoğraf Arkası Notları (Travel)
2000: Tutamadığım Sözler (Poetry)
2000: Yirminci Yüzyılda Yazınımıza Elverenler (Collected biography)
2001: Maskeler (Short Story)
2005: Aldanış (Novel)

References

Living people
1948 births
Writers from Istanbul
Istanbul University alumni
Miss Turkey winners
Miss World 1966 delegates
Turkish women writers
Turkish women poets
Turkish publishers (people)
Turkish women in business
Turkish businesspeople